Cymatosyrinx parciplicata is a species of sea snail, a marine gastropod mollusk in the family Drilliidae.

Description
The shell grows to a length of 23 mm.

The shell is elongate-acuminate. Its color is dark white. The spire is elongate and contains 7 whorls. The first one is rounded, the second whorl is slightly convex, the others are convex and obtusely angulated. They show a few smooth oblique plicae. The interstices between the ribs are rather smooth. The body whorl is oblong and slightly convex on top and with a short, but conspicuous, fold below the suture. There is no dorsal varix. The siphonal canal is truncated. The columella is nearly straight and very thin plated.

Distribution
This species occurs in the demersal zone of the subtropical Northwest Pacific Ocean off Japan and the Philippines.

References

 Tucker, J.K. (2004). "Catalog of recent and fossil turrids (Mollusca: Gastropoda)". Zootaxa. 682: 1–1295.

External links
  Petit, R. E. (2009). "George Brettingham Sowerby, I, II & III: their conchological publications and molluscan taxa". Zootaxa. 2189: 1–218.

parciplicata
Gastropods described in 1915